Bena can refer to:
 Banna people, an ethnic group in Ethiopia
 Bena (ethnic group), ethnic group in Tanzania
 Bena language, language in the Bantu group, spoken by the Bena people of Tanzania
 Bena language (Adamawa), an Adamawa language of Nigeria
 Bena (moth), genus of moth in the family Nolidae
 Bena (grape), grape variety indigenous to Bosnia and Herzegovina
 Bena, California, community in Kern County, California, United States
 Bena, Minnesota, city in Cass County, Minnesota, United States
 Bena, Nigeria, a village in Kebbi State, northwestern Nigeria
 Bena, Victoria, a rural hamlet 100 km south-east of Melbourne
 Diphenhydramine, known by the trade name Bena
 British Naturalists' Association, formerly known as the British Empire Naturalists' Association (BENA)